Georg Friedrich Wilhelm Schaeffler (born 19 October 1964) is a German billionaire businessman and owner of 80% of the holding company INA Holding Schaeffler GmbH & Co. KG, which includes Schaeffler AG. His mother, Maria-Elisabeth Schaeffler, owns the other 20%. Both inherited their fortune from Schaeffler's father, Georg Schaeffler, who died in 1996. Schaeffler is the head of the supervisory board of Schaeffler Group and a member of the supervisory board of Continental AG. As of March 2020, Schaeffler was ranked by Forbes as the 96th-richest person in the world, with a net worth of $11.2 billion.

Early life 
Schaeffler was born in Erlangen. From 1986 to 1990, Schaeffler studied business and economics at the University of St. Gallen, Switzerland, and worked within the Schaeffler Group from 1990 to 1996. He later went on to receive a law degree and a masters from Duke University and practised international business law in Dallas, Texas. He served two years in the German armed forces, reaching the rank of lieutenant in the air force reserves.

Career 
Schaeffler has expanded the company over the years. In 1999, he took over the German automotive manufacturer LuK GmbH, and in 2002, the German producer of ball bearings FAG Kugelfischer. After the expense of $15 billion, in 2008 Georg and the newly founded Schaeffler Group, acquired auto parts giant and one of the largest tire manufacturers in the world, Continental AG. The Schaeffler Group employs over 80,000 people in 170 locations in 49 different countries.

According to ProPublica, the US Internal Revenue Service (IRS) "...embarked on a contentious audit of Schaeffler in 2012, eventually determining that he owed about $1.2 billion in unpaid taxes and penalties. But after seven years of grinding bureaucratic combat, the IRS abandoned its campaign", and accepted "tens of millions".

Wealth 
According to Forbes, Schaeffler has a net worth of US$20.1 billion. In March 2020, Schaeffler was ranked #96 on Forbes' list of global billionaires and #4 for Germany. He and his mother's (Maria-Elisabeth Schaeffler) combined wealth is estimated to be US$34 billion.

Other activities 
 Commerzbank, Member of the Central Advisory Board

Personal life 
He is divorced with four children and lives in Herzogenaurach. He visits the United States several times a year.

References 

Businesspeople from Bavaria
German billionaires
Living people
University of St. Gallen alumni
1964 births
People from Erlangen
20th-century German businesspeople
21st-century German businesspeople